Mohammad Mohsen Rabbani (born 18 April 1983 in Qom) is an Iranian Pole vaulter.

Competition record

References
 

1983 births
Living people
People from Qom
Iranian pole vaulters
Athletes (track and field) at the 2006 Asian Games
Athletes (track and field) at the 2010 Asian Games
Male pole vaulters
Iranian male athletes
Asian Games competitors for Iran
Competitors at the 2007 Summer Universiade
Competitors at the 2011 Summer Universiade
Islamic Solidarity Games competitors for Iran
Islamic Solidarity Games medalists in athletics
21st-century Iranian people